Negash (Amharic: ነጋሽ) is a male name of Ethiopian origin that may refer to:

Negash Ali (born 1990), Eritrean-Danish songwriter
Negash Teklit (born 1970), Ethiopian football coach
Habte Negash (born 1967), Ethiopian long-distance runner
Mesfin Negash, Ethiopian journalist

See also
Nejashi, Ethiopian village and earliest Muslim settlement in Africa

Amharic-language names